Courtney Niemiec (born April 13, 1992) is a retired American soccer player who last played for the North Carolina Courage of the National Women's Soccer League.

Early life
Niemiec was born in Philadelphia, Pennsylvania.

Niemiec played high school soccer at Little Flower Catholic High School for Girls, where she was a four-year varsity letter-winner in both soccer and lacrosse. Niemiec played club soccer for FC Delco Sting.

Collegiate career
Niemiec attended La Salle University, where she played as a defender and midfielder for the Explorers. Niemiec scored 8 goals and had 14 assists in 87 appearances for the Explorers, starting every game her sophomore, junior, and senior seasons.

Playing career

Club

Portland Thorns, 2014–2015
Niemiec was signed by the Portland Thorns on April 9, 2014, as a free agent.  On June 24, 2015, the Portland Thorns FC waived defender Courtney Niemiec.  Niemiec, 23, appeared in four matches (3 starts) for Thorns FC during
the 2015 season. An undrafted rookie in 2014, Niemiec made the team
through an open tryout and started 10 games in her first NWSL season.

She was waived by the Portland Thorns FC in June 2015.

Western New York Flash, 2016
Niemiec signed with the Western New York Flash for the 2016 NWSL season. She started four games for the Flash with six appearances. Ended up winning the national championship with the flash.

North Carolina Courage, 2017
It was announced on January 9, 2017, that the Western New York Flash was officially sold to new ownership, moved to North Carolina, and rebranded as the North Carolina Courage. Niemiec appeared in 6 matches for the Courage, starting in 4 matches and playing 395 total minutes.

On May 27, 2017, Niemiec announced her retirement from professional soccer.

Awards and honors
Individual
 First Team All-Atlantic 10: 2013
 Second Team NSCAA All-Mid Atlantic Region: 2013
 Atlantic 10 Defensive Player of the Year: 2012
 First Team All-Atlantic 10: 2012
 First Team NSCAA All-Mid Atlantic Region: 2012

See also

References

External links 
 National Women's Soccer League player profile
 Portland Thorns player profile
 La Salle player profile
 

1992 births
Living people
National Women's Soccer League players
Portland Thorns FC players
Soccer players from Philadelphia
La Salle University alumni
La Salle Explorers women's soccer players
Western New York Flash players
North Carolina Courage players
Women's association football defenders
American women's soccer players